The Legend of the Book and the Sword is a Hong Kong television series adapted from Louis Cha's novel The Book and the Sword. It was first broadcast on TVB in Hong Kong in 1976.

Cast
 Note: Some of the characters' names are in Cantonese romanisation.

 Adam Cheng as Chan Ka-lok / Kin-lung Emperor
 Liza Wang as Fok-ching-tung
 Candice Yu as Heung-heung
 Louise Lee as Lok Bing
 Paul Chu as Man Tai-loi
 Ha Yu as Yu Yu-tung
 Kwan Hoi-san as Luk Fei-ching
 Shih Kien as Cheung Chiu-chung
 Deborah Lee as Yuk-yu-yee
 Gigi Wong as Lee Yun-chi
 Ko Miu-see as Chow Yee
 Lawrence Ng as Tsui Tin-wang
 Cheung Wood-yau as Yu Man-ting
 Wong Sun as Chiu Bun-san
 Kwan Chung as Wai Chun-wah
 Kong Ngai as Muk Cheuk-lun
 Lo Kwok-wai as Lee Ho-sau
 Lo Hoi-pang as Cheung Chun
 Ng Man-tat as Cheung Sei-kan
 Wong Yuen-sun as Shek Seung-ying
 Tam Chuen-hing as Yeung Sing-hip
 Lau Kwok-shing as Ha Hap-toi
 Kam Lui as Fong Yau-tak
 Yuen Siu-tien as Chan Cheng-tak

List of featured songs
 Note: The song titles are in Cantonese romanisation.

 Syu Kim Yan Sau Luk (書劍恩仇錄; The Book and the Sword) performed by Adam Cheng / Roman Tam (as versionized.)
 Si Nim (思念; Missing You) performed by Adam Cheng and Liza Wang
 Si Si Mei Mun Chuk (事事未滿足; Never Satisfied) performed by Susanna Kwan
 On La Ngo Chu (安拉我主; Allah, My Lord) performed by Liza Wang
 Kam Sau Kin Kwan (錦繡乾坤; Beautiful Universe) performed by Adam Cheng
 Yan Sang Yau Ho Kau (人生有何求; What Do You Ask For in Life) performed by Liza Wang
 To Heung Wan (悼香魂; Mourning Heung-heung) performed by various cast members
 Yau Ji Han (游子恨; Prodigal's Lament) performed by Adam Cheng
 Syun Long (選郎; Choosing a Groom) performed by Liza Wang
 Seung Sung (相送; Seeing Each Other Off) performed by Adam Cheng and Liza Wang
 Luk Sui Ching Bo (綠水青波; Azure Waters, Blue Waves) performed by Liza Wang
 Leung Siu Fa Yuet Ching (良宵花月情; Pleasant Feelings in the Night) performed by Susanna Kwan

External links

1970s Hong Kong television series
1976 Hong Kong television series debuts
1976 Hong Kong television series endings
TVB dramas
Hong Kong wuxia television series
Television series set in the Qing dynasty
Works based on The Book and the Sword
Television shows about rebels
Cantonese-language television shows
Television shows based on works by Jin Yong
Qianlong Emperor